Gordon Matthew Strachan (16 November 1947 – 3 May 2016) was a Scottish rugby union player who was capped five times by his country.

Biography
Strachan was born in 1947 in Littlemill, Ayrshire. After leaving Ayr Academy, he played rugby for Ayr RFC and then Jordanhill College. While a Jordanhill player, he played five times for Scotland at number 8, his first appearance being in the match against England in March 1971. He received his final cap against Presidents XV in 1973. He returned to Ayr in the late 1970s, when he captained the team, and after retiring from playing, coached Ayr, taking them from the third division to the first. He later worked as a P.E. teacher at Kyle Academy in Ayr.

His daughter Shonagh was a member of girl band Lemonescent in the 2000s.

He died on 3 May 2016, aged 68, after suffering from cardiac amyloidosis.

References

1947 births
2016 deaths
Scottish rugby union players
Scotland international rugby union players
Rugby union players from East Ayrshire
Jordanhill RFC players
People educated at Ayr Academy
Ayr RFC players
Rugby union number eights